Beyond Human is an original TV documentary series that previously aired on Teletoon's Super Fan Friday. The show features people who can do amazing things.

References

External links
 (Archived link)

2010s Canadian documentary television series
Teletoon original programming
2011 Canadian television series debuts
2011 Canadian television series endings